Patulifrons is a genus of parasitic flies in the family Tachinidae. There is one described species in Patulifrons, P. varia.

Distribution
Australia.

References

Dexiinae
Diptera of Australasia
Monotypic Brachycera genera
Tachinidae genera